In mathematics, the standard complex, also called standard resolution, bar resolution, bar complex, bar construction, is a way of constructing resolutions in homological algebra.

The name "bar complex" comes from the fact that  used a vertical bar | as a shortened form of the tensor product  in their notation for the complex.

Definition

If A is an associative algebra over a field K, the standard complex is

with the differential given by

If A is a unital K-algebra, the standard complex is exact.  Moreover,  is a free A-bimodule resolution of the A-bimodule A.

Normalized standard complex

Monads

See also

Koszul complex

References

Homological algebra